Bavaria brewery may refer to:

Bavaria Brewery (Colombia), brewery in Colombia, owned by Anheuser-Busch InBev
Bavaria Brewery (Netherlands), family owned brewery in the Netherlands, which also produces La Trappe beers for the Koningshoeven Abbey
Bavarian Brewing Company, closed brewery in Kentucky, USA
Bavaria – St. Pauli Brewery, closed German brewery whose brands were taken over by the Holsten Brewery